German Assyrians are Germans of Assyrian descent or Assyrians who have German citizenship. The Assyrians in Germany mainly came from Azerbaijan, Turkey, Jordan, Syria, Iraq and Iran. 

The immigrant community of people of Assyrian descent in Germany is estimated at around 100,000 people. They are known in German either as Assyrer ("Assyrians") or as Aramäer ("Arameans"). Significant local communities exist in certain cities and towns such as Munich, Wiesbaden, Paderborn, Essen, Bietigheim-Bissingen, Ahlen, Göppingen, Köln, Hamburg, Berlin, Augsburg and Gütersloh.

History

Being oppressed and persecuted throughout the 20th century for their religion, many arrived from Turkey only seeking a life. The first wave arrived in the 1960s and 1970s as part of the German economic plan of "Gastarbeiter". As Germany was seeking immigrant workers (largely from Turkey), many Assyrians saw an opportunity for freedom and success and applied for visas along with Turks. Assyrians started working in restaurants or as construction workers for companies and many began running their own shops. The first Assyrian immigrants in Germany started organizing themselves by forming culture clubs and building churches. The second wave came almost immediately after the first, as a result of two events.

The first event was when the Assyrian mayor of Dargecit was assassinated in 1979 in what has been looked at as a takeover of the local government by Kurds of the Assyrian homeland in Turkey. The new mayor was a Kurd, and that caused the local government to allow huge influxes of Kurds to start squatting on land and driving people off their land. The second event was when the Kurdish–Turkish conflict began in 1984. The area was effectively turned into a sectarian warzone between Turkey and the PKK with Assyrians caught in the middle. Nearly all Assyrians ended up fleeing the area, seeing as how both the Turks and Kurds were hostile, and they would be defenseless now that the local government is out of their hands. They continued to trickle out all the way until the late 90s when the conflict died down, by that time only around 1,000–2,000 people out of 70,000 prior to the conflict remained. Since the early 2000s some reverse migration back to Turkey has occurred now that the conflict is over, with now around 3,000 in the region. Most Assyrians are settled into Germany's high quality of life and good economy now, so the majority would probably only rebuild/repair their homes and property in Turkey for use as vacation homes at most.

See also
Swedish Assyrians 
Assyrian diaspora
Assyrians in Turkey

References

External links
Suryoyo Sat Germany
Federation of the Arameans in Germany - FASD
Assyrian Youth Federation Middle Europe
Mesopotamian Club Augsburg

Germany
Ethnic groups in Germany
Assyrian ethnic groups
Middle Eastern diaspora in Germany
German people of Assyrian/Syriac descent